Linden McKinley High School is located in the South Linden neighborhood of Columbus, Ohio and is part of the Columbus City Schools District. The school has an enrollment of approximately 500 students in grades 9 to 12.

Currently Linden McKinley maintains advanced placement courses in: English literature, English language, calculus, government and US history. In addition Kenyon College classes in English and Biology are held on site for dual credit. In 2018, it was recommended for conversion to a middle school, as most students in its catchment area attend other high schools.

Athletic State Championships

 Boys Basketball - 1967,1975,1977 
 Boys Track and Field – 1977

Notable alumni

James E. Bowman - Linden's First 3-time All City Basketball Player, Former President of the Columbus Urban League
Cedric Brown - NFL Player
Jim Cleamons - NBA Player and Coach
Buster Douglas - Boxing, World Heavyweight Champion
Hilmer Kenty - Boxing, World Lightweight Champion
Jerry Page - Boxing, Olympic Gold Medalist
William Thomas, Jr. - Actor

See also
Schools in Columbus, Ohio

References

External links

External links
 

High schools in Columbus, Ohio
Public high schools in Ohio